
Gmina Rudnik nad Sanem is an urban-rural gmina (administrative district) in Nisko County, Subcarpathian Voivodeship, in south-eastern Poland.

Villages
Apart from the town of Rudnik nad Sanem, Gmina Rudnik nad Sanem contains the villages and settlements of Chałupki, Kopki, Przędzel and Przędzel-Kolonia.

Neighbouring gminas
Gmina Rudnik nad Sanem is bordered by the gminas of Jeżowe, Krzeszów, Nisko, Nowa Sarzyna and Ulanów.

References

Polish official population figures 2006

Rudnik nad Sanem
Gmina Rudnik Nad Sanem